

Ja 

 Harry Jackman b. 1900 first elected in 1940 as National Government member for Rosedale, Ontario.
 George Jackson b. 1808 first elected in 1867 as Conservative member for Grey South, Ontario.
 Joseph Jackson b. 1831 first elected in 1882 as Liberal member for Norfolk South, Ontario.
 Ovid Jackson b. 1939 first elected in 1993 as Liberal member for Bruce—Grey, Ontario.
 Samuel Jacob Jackson b. 1848 first elected in 1904 as Liberal member for Selkirk, Manitoba.
 William Jackson b. 1858 first elected in 1904 as Conservative member for Elgin West, Ontario.
 Jean-Marc Jacob b. 1947 first elected in 1993 as Bloc Québécois member for Charlesbourg, Quebec.
 Pierre Jacob b. 1953 first elected in 2011 as New Democratic Party member for Brome—Missisquoi, Quebec. 
 Samuel William Jacobs b. 1871 first elected in 1917 as Laurier Liberal member for George-Étienne Cartier, Quebec.
 Carole Jacques b. 1960 first elected in 1984 as Progressive Conservative member for Montreal—Mercier, Quebec.
 Helena Jaczek b. 1950 first elected in 2019 as Liberal member for Markham—Stouffville, Ontario.
 Frank Eric Jaenicke b. 1892 first elected in 1945 as Cooperative Commonwealth Federation member for Kindersley, Saskatchewan.
 Rahim Jaffer b. 1971 first elected in 1997 as Reform member for Edmonton—Strathcona, Alberta.
 John Mason James b. 1911 first elected in 1949 as Liberal member for Durham, Ontario.
 Kenneth Albert James b. 1934 first elected in 1984 as Progressive Conservative member for Sarnia—Lambton, Ontario.
 Roxanne James b. 1966 first elected in 2011 as Conservative member for Scarborough Centre, Ontario. 
 Clarence Jameson b. 1872 first elected in 1908 as Conservative member for Digby, Nova Scotia.
 Richard Willis Jameson b. 1851 first elected in 1897 as Liberal member for Winnipeg, Manitoba.
 Donald Campbell Jamieson b. 1921 first elected in 1966 as Liberal member for Burin—Burgeo, Newfoundland and Labrador.
 Joseph Jamieson b. 1839 first elected in 1882 as Conservative member for Lanark North, Ontario.
 Richard Janelle b. 1947 first elected in 1978 as Social Credit member for Lotbinière, Quebec.
 Tamara Jansen first elected in 2019 as Conservative member for Cloverdale—Langley City, British Columbia.
 Norman Jaques b. 1880 first elected in 1935 as Social Credit member for Wetaskiwin, Alberta.
 Bud Jardine b. 1935 first elected in 1984 as Progressive Conservative member for Northumberland—Miramichi, New Brunswick.
 Robert Jarvis b. 1936 first elected in 1979 as Progressive Conservative member for Willowdale, Ontario.
 William Herbert Jarvis b. 1930 first elected in 1972 as Progressive Conservative member for Perth—Wilmot, Ontario.

Je 

 Brian Jean b. 1963 first elected in 2004 as Conservative member for Athabasca, Alberta.
 Joseph Jean b. 1890 first elected in 1932 as Liberal member for Maisonneuve, Quebec.
 Hormidas Jeannotte b. 1843 first elected in 1892 as Conservative member for L'Assomption, Quebec.
 Alex Jeffery b. 1909 first elected in 1949 as Liberal member for London, Ontario.
 Otto Jelinek b. 1940 first elected in 1972 as Progressive Conservative member for High Park—Humber Valley, Ontario.
 Lincoln Henry Jelliff b. 1865 first elected in 1921 as Progressive member for Lethbridge, Alberta.
 Matt Jeneroux b. 1981 first elected in 2015 as Conservative member for Edmonton Riverbend, Alberta. 
 John Theophilus Jenkins b. 1829 first elected in 1882 as Liberal-Conservative member for Queen's County, Prince Edward Island.
 Robert Harold Jenkins b. 1873 first elected in 1925 as Liberal member for Queen's, Prince Edward Island.
 Daphne Jennings b. 1939 first elected in 1993 as Reform member for Mission—Coquitlam, British Columbia.
 Marlene Jennings b. 1951 first elected in 1997 as Liberal member for Notre-Dame-de-Grâce—Lachine, Quebec.
 James Kenneth Jepson b. 1942 first elected in 1984 as Progressive Conservative member for London East, Ontario.
 James Jerome b. 1933 first elected in 1968 as Liberal member for Sudbury, Ontario.
 Louis Amable Jetté b. 1836 first elected in 1872 as Liberal member for Montreal East, Quebec.
 Pauline Jewett b. 1922 first elected in 1963 as Liberal member for Northumberland, Ontario.

Jo 

 Christian Jobin b. 1952 first elected in 2003 as Liberal member for Lévis-et-Chutes-de-la-Chaudière, Quebec.
 Amable Jodoin b. 1828 first elected in 1874 as Liberal member for Chambly, Quebec.
 Gord Johns b. 1969 first elected in 2015 as New Democratic Party member for Courtenay—Alberni, British Columbia. 
 Al Johnson b. 1939 first elected in 1988 as Progressive Conservative member for Calgary North, Alberta.
 John Mercer Johnson b. 1818 first elected in 1867 as Liberal member for Northumberland, New Brunswick.
 Morrissey Johnson b. 1932 first elected in 1984 as Progressive Conservative member for Bonavista—Trinity—Conception, Newfoundland and Labrador.
 Paul Léo Maurice Johnson b. 1929 first elected in 1958 as Progressive Conservative member for Chambly—Rouville, Quebec.
 Robert Milton Johnson b. 1879 first elected in 1921 as Progressive member for Moose Jaw, Saskatchewan.
 Merv Johnson b. 1923 first elected in 1953 as Cooperative Commonwealth Federation member for Kindersley, Saskatchewan.
 Alexander Johnston b. 1867 first elected in 1900 as Liberal member for Cape Breton, Nova Scotia.
 Charles Edward Johnston b. 1899 first elected in 1935 as Social Credit member for Bow River, Alberta.
 Donald James Johnston b. 1936 first elected in 1978 as Liberal member for Westmount, Quebec.
 Dale Johnston b. 1941 first elected in 1993 as Reform member for Wetaskiwin, Alberta.
 Howard Earl Johnston b. 1928 first elected in 1965 as Social Credit member for Okanagan—Revelstoke, British Columbia.
 John Frederick Johnston b. 1876 first elected in 1917 as Unionist member for Last Mountain, Saskatchewan.
 Allan Johnston b. 1904 first elected in 1940 as Liberal member for London, Ontario.
 Robert Johnston b. 1856 first elected in 1900 as Conservative member for Cardwell, Ontario.
 Thomas George Johnston b. 1849 first elected in 1898 as Liberal member for Lambton West, Ontario.
 Lewis Wilkieson Johnstone b. 1862 first elected in 1925 as Conservative member for Cape Breton North—Victoria, Nova Scotia.
 Georgina Jolibois b. 1968 first elected in 2015 as New Democratic Party member for Desnethé—Missinippi—Churchill River, Saskatchewan.
 Mélanie Joly b. 1979 first elected in 2015 as Liberal member for Ahuntsic-Cartierville (electoral district), Quebec.
 Henri-Gustave Joly de Lotbinière b. 1829 first elected in 1867 as Liberal member for Lotbinière, Quebec.
 Jean-Luc Joncas b. 1936 first elected in 1984 as Progressive Conservative member for Matapédia—Matane, Quebec.
 Louis Zéphirin Joncas b. 1846 first elected in 1887 as Conservative member for Gaspé, Quebec.
 Alfred Gilpin Jones b. 1824 first elected in 1867 as Anti-Confederate member for Halifax, Nova Scotia.
 David Ford Jones b. 1818 first elected in 1874 as Conservative member for Leeds South, Ontario.
 Eloise Jones b. 1917 first elected in 1964 as Progressive Conservative member for Saskatoon, Saskatchewan.
 Francis Jones b. 1815 first elected in 1867 as Conservative member for Leeds North and Grenville North, Ontario.
 George Burpee Jones b. 1866 first elected in 1921 as Conservative member for Royal, New Brunswick.
 Henry Frank Jones b. 1920 first elected in 1957 as Progressive Conservative member for Saskatoon, Saskatchewan.
 Herbert Ladd Jones b. 1858 first elected in 1887 as Conservative member for Digby, Nova Scotia.
 Jim Jones b. 1943 first elected in 1997 as Progressive Conservative member for Markham, Ontario.
 Leonard C. Jones b. 1924 first elected in 1974 as Independent member for Moncton, New Brunswick.
 Owen Lewis Jones b. 1890 first elected in 1948 as Cooperative Commonwealth Federation member for Yale, British Columbia.
 Yvonne Jones b. 1968 first elected in 2013 as Liberal member for Labrador, Newfoundland and Labrador. 
 Bernadette Jordan b. 1963 first elected in 2015 as Liberal member for South Shore—St. Margaret's, Nova Scotia. 
 Jim Jordan b. 1928 first elected in 1988 as Liberal member for Leeds—Grenville, Ontario.
 Joe Jordan b. 1958 first elected in 1997 as Liberal member for Leeds—Grenville, Ontario.
 Warner Herbert Jorgenson b. 1918 first elected in 1957 as Progressive Conservative member for Provencher, Manitoba.
 Fernand Jourdenais b. 1933 first elected in 1984 as Progressive Conservative member for La Prairie, Quebec.
 Majid Jowhari b. 1960 first elected in 2015 as Liberal member for Richmond Hill, Ontario. 
 Serge Joyal b. 1945 first elected in 1974 as Liberal member for Maisonneuve—Rosemont, Quebec.

Ju 

 Peter Julian b. 1962 first elected in 2004 as New Democratic Party member for Burnaby—New Westminster, British Columbia.
 Douglas Jung b. 1925 first elected in 1957 as Progressive Conservative member for Vancouver Centre, British Columbia.
 Alex Jupp b. 1927 first elected in 1979 as Progressive Conservative member for Mississauga North, Ontario.
 René Jutras b. 1913 first elected in 1940 as Liberal member for Provencher, Manitoba.

J